The Volkswagen Zwickau-Mosel Plant is an automobile factory, which was founded on 26 September 1990 in today's Zwickau district of Mosel and together with the Chemnitz plant and the Transparent Factory belongs to Volkswagen Sachsen based in Zwickau. Currently (as of spring 2019), the Zwickau plant has about 8,000 employees. Signalling a milestone the last combustion vehicle was produced on 26 June 2020.

History
With the founding of Horch and Audi in 1904 and 1909 respectively, Zwickau became the cradle of the Saxon automobile industry. Due to the traditions of automotive engineering in the region and because of the skilled workers potential, Volkswagen decided as the first large enterprise of the Federal Republic to build up a completely new work in Saxony and provided for it considerable investments. As a result, other investors settled in the region.

Already in the final phase of the GDR the Trabant 1.1 was built in the northern Zwickau suburb of Mosel from 1989 with a four-cylinder four-stroke engine manufactured under VW license. The production was discontinued in 1991, because parallel to this one the mass production of the Volkswagen Polo Mk2 had already started on 21 May 1990 in the Mosel factory. On 15 February 1991, the production of the Volkswagen Golf Mk2 began parallel to the Polo production, whose successor is still produced today in the Zwickau plant. The suburb Mosel was incorporated into Zwickau on 1 January 1999. In 2007, they officially introduced the new factory designation Volkswagen-Fahrzeugwerk Zwickau.

Since production began in 1990, around 6 million Volkswagen vehicles have been delivered. In 2010, 1,350 vehicles of the VW model series Golf and Passat left the production lines of the Volkswagen plant every day. With 250,000 vehicles, 2010 was a record result. In addition, there are the bodies for the luxury class vehicles Phaeton and Bentley Continental GT, which are completely painted with special transporters in the "Transparent Factory" Dresden or after Crewe in England. Since 2001, around 100,000 bodies have been produced for the Phaeton and Bentley Continental series (50,000 each). Since 2017, bodies for the Bentley Bentayga and since 2018 bodies for the Lamborghini Urus have been produced at the Zwickau plant.

On May 11, 2004, the festive event for the 100th anniversary of the founding of Horch. High-ranking persons from politics and economics appreciated the scientific and technical achievements of the car makers from southwest Saxony in their greetings.

Directly adjacent is also a factory of the supplier GKN Driveline.

In 2019, the factory was completely converted to the production of electric cars. The last internal combustion engine (ICE) vehicle rolled off the Zwickau plant on 26 June 2020. The car is a seventh generation Golf R Estate with 2.0-litre petrol engine in Oryx White Pearl Effect. It is the 9,512,001th ICE vehicle produced in the plant, effectively ended 116 years of ICE vehicle assembly in Zwickau-Mosel.

Current production

References

External links 

 Volkswagen Sachsen GmbH
 Volkswagen Sachsen GmbH Zwickau Plant, VW Newsroom, February 2021, .pdf file with info

Volkswagen Group factories
Zwickau
Motor vehicle assembly plants in Germany
1990 establishments in East Germany